The Green is a cricket ground in Comber, Northern Ireland and the home of North Down Cricket Club. The ground was established in 1857 and had capacity of 2000 in early days. The two ends are Pavilion End and Mount Alexander End. In 1995, the ground hosted its first List A match when Ireland played Kent in the 1995 Benson & Hedges Cup.  In 2005, the ground hosted three further List A matches in the 2005 ICC Trophy, which saw matches between Ireland and Uganda, Bermuda and Uganda, and Namibia and Oman.

References

External links
The Green, Comber at CricketArchive
The Green, Comber at ESPN Cricinfo 

Cricket grounds in Northern Ireland
Sports venues in County Down
Sports venues completed in 1857
1857 establishments in Ireland
Comber